Cantref Coch was a cantref associated with the kingdoms of Ergyng, Gwent and the later Kingdom of Glamorgan. Its area is defined as the land between the River Severn and the River Wye, with the Severn Sea as its southern border although its northern border is less certain. Cantref Coch is one of the few medieval cantrefi named by Welsh writers that is not within the modern nation of Wales.

History

Early History 
The area that would become Cantref Coch was home to native Iron working activities for sometime before the arrival of the Romans. However, it may also have been highly contested between the British Dobunni and Silures tribes, with the paucity of numismatic finds in the area suggesting that neither tribe held control for long. The Roman era would see the area pacified and become a center of religious and industrial activity, as well as the location of an important road from Glevum into South Wales.

The increases in production of iron ore and charcoal would have strengthened links with Ariconium, a possible administrative centre for these industries. Ariconium may have been home to a number of ancient bloomeries, which were greatly improved when the Romans introduced the bellows. These activity made Ariconium very wealthy, which may in turn have led to it becoming a powerful early kingdom after the departure of Roman forces around the 360s.

As part of Ergyng 

It is generally believed that Ariconium was a latinisation of an existing British Celtic name, and that the post-Roman polity of Ergyng represents a continuation of Pre-Roman or Romano-British culture. Cantref Coch may naturally have formed part of the Kingdom of Ergyng as it emerged in the fifth century, but it remained far from the kingdom's Herefordshire heartland. As such the area would once again have been highly contested as Ergyng's fortunes changed for the worse. It is very likely that Saint Brioc would have been active in the cantref during the fifth century, as the later Hundred of St Briavels, St Briavels parish and St Briavels Castle are all named for the saint.

As part of Gwent and Glamorgan 
Although historical records of Ergyng and its cantrefi remain scarce, Cantref Coch would be better recorded in Medieval Welsh literature, as well as by later Cambro-Norman writers and British antiquarians.

In the sixteenth century Humphrey Llwyd names Cantref Coch as the "seventh cantref of the Kingdom of Glamorgan, now in Gloucestshire, and is called the Forest of Dean". Other writers such as Richard Blome describe it as one of the three cantrefs of the Kingdom of Gwent, "the Cantref Coch, now in Gloucestershire and called the Forest of Dean".
Mark Willett described the cantref as one of four that comprised Gwent.

Iolo Morganwg called Cantref Coch the third part of the kingdom of Iestyn ap Gwrgant, separating it from both Gwent and Morgannwg proper (Glywysing). Iolo gives a fuller description of the Cantref's extent under Iestyn, stating that it stretched "from the Wye and Severn, up to the bridge at Gloucester, and from there to Hereford", making the Cantref much larger than any of the English hundreds or the area now considered the Forest of Dean.

Iolo states that the land was acquired through Iestyn's second wife Angharad, the daughter of "Elystan Glodrydd" whom Iolo describes as "king of the Cantref Coch." This lineage is not supported by the more established Welsh genealogies, none of which mention the marriage. It may be that Iolo made use of Elystan as he was in fact, "king of the Rhwng Gwy a Hafren" (the land between the Wye and the Severn). However, Rhwng Gwy a Hafren was located further north in Powys, rather than in the locality of the Cantref Coch.

Later history 
According to William of Malmesbury, Æthelstan met with a number of Welsh kings in Hereford in 926, and the border between the Kingdom of Gwent and the Kingdom of England was agreed at the Wye, removing Cantref Coch from Gwent's historic boundaries. However, Edward Stradling recorded that in the time of Edward the Confessor (1042-1066), Griffith the fourth son of Iestyn ap Gwrgant became Lord of Caerleon, and that his Lordship comprised the cantrefi of Gwynllwg, Gwent isa and Cantref Coch. As such, it seems that some of the ancient links between the area and Gwent were carried forward well into the Norman era. Secular and ecclesiastic holdings would continue to be transferred between local leaders and the Lordship of Caerleon or other institutions in Gwent. As late as 1244, the Lord of the Bledisloe hundred confirmed an ancient claim by Llanthony Priory that its tenants in the manor of Alvington were exempt from suit to the hundred.

Notes

Bibliography
 

 

Cantrefs
 
History of Gloucestershire
History of Monmouthshire